Tam O'Shanter is a locality in the Cassowary Coast Region, Queensland, Australia.

Geography 
 From the mountain, the locality is bounded to the south-west by the Tam O'Shanter Range.

The locality is entirely within a number of protected areas, mostly within the Djiru National Park but with a small area in the south-east of the locality being within the Tam O'Shanter Forest Reserve.

History 
The locality presumably takes its name from  Tam O'Shanter Point on the coastline nearby. The point was named  by Captain Owen Stanley of  after the barque Tam O'Shanter, which carried Edmund Kennedy's ill-fated expedition to North Queensland in 1848.

Notes

References

Further reading 

 

Cassowary Coast Region
Localities in Queensland